Punk Goes... is a series of pop albums released by Fearless Records in which punk rock bands perform covers of songs from other genres. As of 2019, the series consists of nineteen compilation albums.

Though predominantly a series of cover albums, Punk Goes Acoustic, Punk Goes Acoustic 2, and Punk Goes Acoustic Vol. 3 deviate from this theme, featuring acoustic versions of original songs by the featured bands. 2013's Punk Goes Christmas and 2015 rerelease of Punk Goes Christmas titled Punk Goes Christmas: Deluxe Edition  features a mix of both Christmas-themed original songs and covers. Similarly, the series' first installment, 2000's Punk Goes Metal, consists of covers with the exception of "Why Rock?" performed by The Aquabats, which was an original song credited to a fictitious band called "Leather Pyrate".

Albums

See also
 'Tis the Season to Be Fearless, a Fearless Records album of Christmas songs by punk artists

References

Punk Goes series
Compilation album series